Hanımın Çiftliği is a Turkish drama series. It has been adapted from Orhan Kemal's novel Hanımın Çiftliği. It has been very praised and won numerous awards.

Plot

The plot sets around a poor worker girl named Güllü. She works in a factory and is constantly mistreated by her father and older brother. She is in love with a man named Kemal, a factory worker as well, and they wish to get married but her father won't let her because he wants her to marry Ramazan, the nephew of the factory owner. As the story develops Kemal and Güllü plan to run away together but are stopped by her older brother who comes after them with a gun. Kemal manages to take the gun from Güllüs brother and shoot him but is arrested by the police for doing this. As Kemal ends up in prison, Güllü is beaten worse than before for refusing to marry Ramazan. Her mother cannot stand to see her daughter be abused like this and goes to the prison to persuade Kemal to tell Güllü he does not love her anymore, so she will marry Ramazan. After hearing about the continuing abuse, Kemal agrees to do this and sends Güllü a letter telling her to do what her father says. Güllü feels she has nothing to live for anymore and finally agrees to marry Ramazan. As Ramazan takes Güllü to his uncles farm to marry her there, his uncle spots her and falls madly in love with her. Güllü who absolutely resents Ramazan, agrees to marry his uncle Muzaffer instead even though she doesn't love him. Muzaffer is the factory owner and is extremely wealthy compared to most of the town. As their marriage evolves Güllü starts to fall in love with Muzaffer and they become very happy together. In the later episodes, while Güllü is pregnant, Muzaffer is killed and Güllü is left to run the factory and farm all by herself. Her father and brother still try to interfere with her life but being wealthier and more powerful, she does not let them.

The other factory workers are working twelve hours a day and are not getting paid for some of them and since Güllü knows what they are going through, having been a worker herself, they ask her to improve their conditions.

As the story develops, Güllü tries to make some changes in the factory, deal with her family and find out who murdered her husband.
The police then find out that the killer is Güllü's brother, Hamza. Knowing that Hamza cannot plot such thing on his own, the police question him to find out who forced him into killing Muzaffer. After many hours of questioning, Hamza admits that Zekai, the man who manages Muzaffer's factory is the killer. Zekai cannot bear the environment of the prison and hangs himself while he is in the prison. In the meanwhile, Muzaffer's sister, Halide, and his nephew Ramazan try to get their share of lands and money from Muzaffer's will, and Güllü is taken to hospital to give birth to Muzaffer's child.

In the meantime Güllü meets up with Kemal and they fall in love with each other again. During their wedding the workers burn Güllü's house because they didn't get paid. However Güllü did pay their salary its just Zekai that didn't lend the money to the factory workers on purpose so they harm Güllü. When Güllü and Kemal find out that the mansion is on fire they realize that Güllü's baby, Ali, is in there. Kemal quickly runs in and saves the baby however he ends up dying. Years later Ali is a little young boy and they live together in a faraway cottage happily.

International broadcasters
  on PMC as عمارت سراب (Lady's farm)
  on Hum Sitaray as Wadi e Ishq
  on Kanal D as Hanımın Çiftliği
  on Kanal 5 and A1 as Имотот на дамата (Lady's farm)
  on RTV Pink as Nasleđe jedne dame
  on Pink M as Nasleđe jedne dame
  on Pink BH as Nasleđe jedne dame
  on Nova TV and Doma TV as Polja nade
  on 2M TV as ماتنسانيش (Don't forget me)
  on Dubai One as سيدة المزرعة (Lady's farm)
  on Alhayat TV as سيدة المزرعة (Lady's farm)
  on Nessma TV as سيدة المزرعة (Lady's farm)
  on Future TV as سيدة المزرعة (Lady's farm)
  on Kanal D as Stăpâna inimii

References

External links
 Hanımın Çiftliği – Official Website

Turkish drama television series
2009 Turkish television series debuts
2011 Turkish television series endings
2000s Turkish television series
2010s Turkish television series
Kanal D original programming